The statue of Lázaro Cárdenas may refer to:

 Statue of Lázaro Cárdenas (Madrid), Spain
 Statue of Lázaro Cárdenas (Puerto Vallarta), Mexico

See also
 Monument to Lázaro Cárdenas, Mexico City